"Christianity Is Stupid" is a song from Negativland's 1987 concept album, Escape from Noise.

Background
In the song, Negativland rearranges words and phrases to form a different meaning. They sampled phrases from a sermon by Estus Pirkle (from his 1968 LP, If Footmen Tire You, What Will Horses Do?, itself later adapted into a film of the same name). Pirkle's narrative included an imagined visit to the US under Communism where public loudspeakers constantly proclaim "Christianity is stupid! Communism is good! Give up!" These phrases were altered and mixed with appropriately march-like heavy metal music and various other sound effects.

In 2004, the song was made into a video entitled "The Mashin' of the Christ" that sampled many Jesus Christ-topic films and footage from Marxist-Leninist countries.

Fake press release
Negativland issued a fake press release saying that the song "Christianity Is Stupid" had played a role in the David Brom murders. The press release implied that Brom had listened to Negativland's song "Christianity Is Stupid" before the fatal quarrel with his religious parents. The group claimed they were "advised by Federal Official Dick Jordan not to leave town pending an investigation into the Brom murders". Brom, 16 at the time, had killed his family with an axe. Negativland's press release was picked up by San Francisco Bay Area media, including CBS News. Negativland recorded much of the news about their supposed influence on Brom, and in 1989 worked this material into another album called Helter Stupid.

In reality, there was no official named "Dick Jordan", and Brom did not possess any Negativland music. Nevertheless, pundits and journalists took the press release at face value, and the hoax received widespread media coverage. Negativland encouraged the spread of the story by steadfastly refusing further comment, supposedly on the advice of their attorney "Hal Stakke", another fictional person invented by the band. Much of this media coverage was negative. The resulting media craze, stemming from journalists neglecting to fact-check, is lampooned in the title track of their 1989 album, Helter Stupid, whose insert also includes background information behind the band's prank.

See also
Ron Ormond
Plunderphonics

References

External links
The single on Negativland's official YouTube channel
Official YouTube video for Part 2 of "Christianity Is Stupid"

1987 songs
Christianity in music
Criticism of Christianity
Negativland songs
Religious controversies in music